Yorkshire Main Football Club is a football club based in Edlington, Doncaster, South Yorkshire, England.

History
Little is known of the club's existence prior to the 1980s, thought it is thought they were formed as Edlington Welfare in the 1920s and proceeded to take the name of Edlington Rangers and Yorkshire Main through until the 1970s.

After being reformed in 1979 the club entered the Doncaster & District Senior League, winning the Division Three title in 1981. A year later they joined the Sheffield Association League, winning the Division Two title. In the summer of 1982 the Association League merged with the Hatchard League to form the Sheffield & Hallamshire County Senior League (S&HCSL), and Yorkshire Main Colliery were placed in Division One, eventually securing a league and cup double in the competition's inaugural campaign.

On the back of their  success in the S&HCSL, the club decided to join the Northern Counties East League (NCEL) in 1983, being entered into Division Two South. After two seasons of league restructuring, they found themselves in Division Two. In 1986 they became Yorkshire Main after the closure of the colliery.

In 1990 they won promotion to the NCEL Division One, and the following year they entered the FA Vase for the first (and only) time.

The club dropped out of the NCEL in 1991 after finishing second bottom, rejoining the Sheffield & Hallamshire County Senior League. They spent seven seasons back in the S&HCSL, during which time they were relegated from Division One to Division Two, and in 1998 they decided to leave to join the Central Midlands League (CMFL), entering the Premier Division.

They spent ten seasons in the Premier Division before winning promotion to the Supreme Division in 2008, only spending one year in the CMFL's top flight before being relegated back again due to the club's lack of floodlights. This problem was rectified in 2010, and just a year later they won the CMFL Floodlit Cup, the CM Premier Championship, the Doncaster and District FA Challenge Cup and the League Cup. The next season they were placed in the North Division when the CMFL restructured, but in 2013 Yorkshire Main left the league.

They rejoined the Doncaster & District Senior League, finishing bottom of the Premier Division in their first season back in the competition.

Season-by-season record

Notable former players
Players that have played in the Football League either before or after playing for Yorkshire Main:
  Glynn Snodin
  Joe Harvey

Ground
The club plays on Edlington Lane in Edlington, postcode DN4 9LT.

Gallery

Honours

League
Northern Counties East League Division 2
Promoted: 1989–90
Central Midlands League Premier Division
Champions: 2010–11
Promoted: 2007–08
Sheffield Association League Division 1
Champions: 1982–83
Sheffield Association League Division 2
Promoted: 1981–82 (champions)
Doncaster & District Senior League Division 3
Champions: 1980–81

Records
Best League performance: 12th in Northern Counties East League Division One, 1990–91
Best FA Vase performance: 1st Round, 1990–91

References

External links
Official website

Football clubs in England
Football clubs in South Yorkshire
Sport in the Metropolitan Borough of Doncaster
Sheffield & Hallamshire County FA members
Doncaster & District Senior League
Sheffield Association League
Sheffield & Hallamshire County Senior Football League
Northern Counties East Football League
Central Midlands Football League
Mining association football teams in England